The Tokio Marine Nichido Big Blue is a semi-professional basketball team that competes in the Japan Industrial and Commercial Basketball Federation.
After the end of the 2018-19 season, the team resigned to its place in the B3 League.

Coaches
Seiichi Kuwamoto
Yoichi Motoyasu (assistant)

Roster

Notable players
Samba Faye
Andre Murray [tl]
Ken Takeda

References

 
Basketball teams in Japan
Sports teams in Tokyo
Tokio Marine